Shenzhen International can refer to:
 Shenzhen International Holdings, Chinese holding company
 Shenzhen International (golf), Chinese golf tournament